Nepal Motion Picture Association is an association that promotes Nepali language films.

References

External links 

 

Film organisations in Nepal